Aidemona is a genus of spur-throated grasshoppers in the family Acrididae. There are about five described species in Aidemona.

Species
These five species belong to the genus Aidemona:
 Aidemona alticola Roberts, H.R., 1947 c g
 Aidemona amrami Roberts, H.R., 1947 c g
 Aidemona azteca (Saussure, 1861) i c g b (Aztec spur-throat)
 Aidemona scarlata Cigliano & D. Otte, 2003 c g
 Aidemona sonorae Roberts, H.R., 1947 c g
Data sources: i = ITIS, c = Catalogue of Life, g = GBIF, b = Bugguide.net

References

Further reading

 
 
 

Melanoplinae
Articles created by Qbugbot